The Q Hotel & Spa Women's Pro Tennis Classic was a tournament for professional female tennis players played on outdoor clay courts. The event was classified as a $50,000 ITF Women's Circuit tournament. It was held annually in Kansas City, Missouri, United States from 2009 to 2011.

Past finals

Singles

Doubles

External links 
 
 ITF search

ITF Women's World Tennis Tour
Hard court tennis tournaments in the United States
Recurring sporting events established in 2009
Recurring sporting events disestablished in 2011
Tennis in Missouri
2009 establishments in Missouri
2011 disestablishments in Missouri
Sports competitions in Kansas City, Missouri